Valērijs or Valerijs is a given name. Notable people with the name include:

Valērijs Agešins (born 1972), Latvian politician and lawyer
Valērijs Belokoņs (born 1960), Latvian businessman and President of English football club Blackpool
Valērijs Buhvalovs (born 1957), Latvian politician and pedagogue
Valērijs Ivanovs (born 1970), Latvian footballer
Valērijs Kargins (born 1961), Latvian economist and banker
Valērijs Šabala (born 1994), Latvian footballer
Valerijs Semjonovs (born 1958), Latvian footballer
Valērijs Žolnerovičs (born 1985), Latvian Olympic athlete

See also 
 Valerij (given name)

 Valer (disambiguation)

Latvian masculine given names